Darrell Nulisch (born September 14, 1952, Dallas, Texas) is an American electric blues singer and harmonica player. Prior to his solo career, he was a member of Anson Funderburgh and the Rockets and The Broadcasters. Nulisch's repertoire incorporates soul combined with R&B and Chicago blues, redesigned to complement his distinctive vocals.

Biography
Nulisch was raised listening to Otis Redding and Al Green. In 1981 he was a founding member of Anson Funderburgh's Rockets and sang with them until 1985. He was then part of Mike Morgan's Crawl, before moving to Massachusetts and joining up with Ronnie Earl's Broadcasters in 1988.

He began his solo career late in 1990, relocating to Boston. James Cotton then asked him to sing with Cotton's band on tour, after Cotton had lost his own voice. Nulisch appeared on Otis Grand's 1996 album, Perfume and Grime, which also utilized Luther Allison.

Several of the songs in Nulisch's repertoire are his own, most of them written with Steve Gomes, who plays bass guitar in Texas Heat, the band that backed Nulisch for a number of years. Other band members included Benjie Porecki (piano), Johnny Moeller (guitar) and Robb Stupka (drums).

Nulisch issued I Like It That Way in 2000. His fan base started to expand from this point. His latest release, Just for You, was released in October 2009. It received a four star rating from Allmusic.

Discography
Business as Usual (1991) - Black Top - Darrell Nulisch & Texas Heat
Bluesoul (1996) - Higher Plane Music
Whole Truth (1998) - Severn Records
I Like It That Way (2000) - Severn Records
Times Like These (2003) - Severn Records
Goin' Back to Dallas (2007) - Severn Records
Just for You (2009) - Severn Records
One Night in Boston (2015) - live album

See also
List of Texas blues musicians
List of electric blues musicians

References

1952 births
Living people
American blues harmonica players
American blues singers
American male singers
Songwriters from Texas
Harmonica blues musicians
Electric blues musicians
Musicians from Dallas
Texas blues musicians
Soul-blues musicians
Musicians from Boston
Songwriters from Massachusetts
American male songwriters